Typhoon Cobra, also known as the Typhoon of 1944 or Halsey's Typhoon (named after Admiral William 'Bull' Halsey), was the United States Navy designation for a powerful tropical cyclone that struck the United States Pacific Fleet in December 1944, during World War II. The storm sank three destroyers, killed 790 sailors, damaged nine other warships and swept dozens of aircraft overboard off their aircraft carriers.

Information given to Halsey about the typhoon was incorrect, and despite warning signs of worsening conditions, the ships remained on station until December 17 when Halsey ordered the Third Fleet into the centre of the typhoon.

With currently available data, it is the twenty-third and last known Western Pacific tropical cyclone formed during the 1944 season.

Meteorological history
On December 17, the typhoon was first observed when United States Third Fleet was refueling. As it was headed towards the fleet, barometric pressures as low as 27.3 inHg (924 mbar) were reported by USS Dewey, but in some ships, barometric pressures were estimated as lower than 27 inHg (917 mbar). The storm was last seen on December 18.

Damage to Task Force 38
TF 38 consisted of seven fleet carriers, six light carriers, eight battleships, fifteen cruisers, and about fifty destroyers. The carriers had been conducting raids against Japanese airfields in the Philippines, and ships were being refueled, especially many destroyers, which were running low on fuel. When the storm hit, the procedure had to be aborted.

Damage to the fleet was severe. Some ships rolled more than 70 degrees.

Spence, Hull, and Monaghan either capsized or were sunk after water flooded down their smokestacks and disabled their engines. Without power, they were unable to control their heading and were at the mercy of the wind and seas. Hickox and Maddox pumped seawater into their empty fuel tanks, adding enough stability to ride out the storm with relatively minor damage.

Many other ships of TF 38 suffered various degrees of damage, especially to radar and radio equipment, which crippled communications within the fleet. Several carriers suffered fires on their hangars and 146 aircraft were wrecked or blown overboard. Nine ships – including one light cruiser, three light carriers, and two escort carriers – suffered enough damage to be sent for repairs.

The carrier  was nearly taken down in flames by its own airplanes as they crashed into bulkheads and exploded during violent rolls. One of those fighting the fires aboard Monterey was then Lt. Gerald Ford, later President of the United States. Ford later recalled nearly going overboard when 20° and greater rolling caused aircraft below decks to careen into each other, igniting a fire. Ford, serving as General Quarters Officer of the Deck, was ordered to go below to assess the raging fire. He did so safely, and reported his findings back to the ship's commanding officer, Captain Stuart Ingersoll. The ship's crew was able to contain the fire, and the ship got underway again.

In the words of Admiral Chester Nimitz, the typhoon's impact "...represented a more crippling blow to the Third Fleet than it might be expected to suffer in anything less than a major action." The events surrounding Typhoon Cobra were similar to those the Japanese navy itself faced some nine years earlier in what they termed the "Fourth Fleet Incident".

Third Fleet damage

 USS Hull: with 70% fuel aboard, capsized and sank with 202 men drowned (62 survivors)
 USS Monaghan: capsized and sank with 256 men drowned (six survivors)
 USS Spence: rudder jammed hard to starboard, capsized, and sank with 317 men drowned (23 survivors) after hoses parted while attempting to refuel from New Jersey because they had also disobeyed orders directly from Admiral Halsey to ballast down. The fuel tanks had to be deballasted (emptied of sea water) to accept needed fuel.  The ship had insufficient fuel to weather the storm.  This was the common problem shared by all the so-called "little boys" (destroyers, destroyer escorts, etc.)
 USS Cowpens: hangar door torn open and RADAR, 20mm gun sponson, whaleboat, jeeps, tractors, kerry crane, and eight aircraft lost overboard. One sailor (ship's air officer Robert Price) lost.
 USS Monterey: hangar deck fire killed three men and caused evacuation of boiler rooms requiring repairs at Bremerton Navy yard
 USS Langley: damaged
 USS Cabot: damaged
 USS San Jacinto: hangar deck planes broke loose and destroyed air intakes, vent ducts and sprinkling system causing widespread flooding. Damage repaired by 
 USS Altamaha: hangar deck crane and aircraft broke loose and broke fire mains
 USS Anzio: required major repair
 USS Nehenta Bay: damaged
 USS Cape Esperance: flight deck fire required major repair
 USS Kwajalein: lost steering control
 USS Iowa: propeller shaft bent and lost a seaplane
 USS Baltimore: required major repair
 USS Miami: required major repair
 USS Dewey: lost steering control, RADAR, the forward stack, and all power when salt water shorted main electrical switchboard
 USS Aylwin: required major repair
 USS Buchanan: required major repair
 USS Dyson: required major repair
 USS Hickox: required major repair
 USS Maddox: damaged
 USS Benham: required major repair
 USS Donaldson: required major repair
 USS Melvin R. Nawman: required major repair
 USS Tabberer: lost foremast
 USS Waterman: damaged
 USS Nantahala: damaged
 USS Jicarilla: damaged
 USS Shasta: damaged—"one deck collapsed, aircraft engines damaged, depth charges broke loose, damaged"

Rescue efforts
The fleet was scattered by the storm. One ship, the destroyer escort , encountered and rescued a survivor from the Hull while itself desperately fighting the typhoon. This was the first survivor from any of the capsized destroyers to be picked up. Shortly thereafter, many more survivors were picked up, in groups or in isolation. Tabberers skipper – Lieutenant Commander Henry Lee Plage – directed that the ship, despite its own dire condition, begin boxed searches to look for more survivors.

Tabberer eventually rescued 55 survivors in a 51-hour search, despite repeated orders from Admiral Halsey to return all ships to port in Ulithi. She picked up 41 men from Hull and 14 from Spence before finally returning to Ulithi after being directly relieved from the search by two destroyer escorts.

After the fleet had regrouped (without Tabberer), ships and aircraft conducted search-and-rescue missions. The destroyer  rescued the only survivors from Monaghan, six in total. She additionally rescued 13 sailors from Hull. Eighteen other survivors from Hull and Spence were rescued over the three days following Typhoon Cobra by other ships of the 3rd Fleet. The destroyer  emerged from the storm undamaged and began looking for survivors before returning to Ulithi on Christmas Eve. In all, 93 men were rescued of the over 800 men presumed missing in the three ships, and two others who had been swept overboard from the escort carrier .

Despite disobeying fleet orders, Plage was awarded the Legion of Merit by Admiral Halsey, and Tabberer'''s crew was awarded Navy Unit Commendation ribbons (the first ever awarded).

Aftermath
While conducting refueling operations off the Philippines, the Third Fleet remained on station rather than breaking up and seeking shelter from the storm.  This led to a severe loss of men, ships, and aircraft. A Court of Inquiry was convened on board the USS Cascade at the naval base at Ulithi, in the Caroline Islands, with Admiral Nimitz, CINCPAC, in attendance at the court. Forty-three-year-old Captain Herbert K. Gates was the judge advocate for the court. The court found that though Halsey had committed an "error of judgement" in sailing the Third Fleet into the heart of the typhoon, it stopped short of unambiguously recommending sanction. In January 1945, Halsey passed command of the Third Fleet to Admiral Raymond A. Spruance.

This typhoon led to the establishment of weather infrastructure of the U.S. Navy, which eventually became the Joint Typhoon Warning Center.

In popular culture
A typhoon plays an important role in Herman Wouk's novel The Caine Mutiny, which is thought to be based on the author's own experience surviving Typhoon Ida on the USS Southard at Okinawa.

See also
 List of Pacific typhoon seasons
 Typhoon Connie (1945), which hit the same fleet in June 1945, leading to immediate formation of Fleet Warning Center in Guam.
 Typhoon Louise (1945), which hit the U.S. fleet off Okinawa in October 1945.
 Joint Typhoon Warning Center

References

Printed media
 Adamson, Hans Christian, George Francis Kosco. Halsey's Typhoons: A Firsthand Account of How Two Typhoons, More Powerful than the Japanese, Dealt Death and Destruction to Admiral Halsey's Third Fleet; New York: Crown Publishers; 1967
 Baldwin, Hanson W. Sea Fights and Shipwrecks; Hanover House; 1955
 Brown, David. Warship Losses of World War II; Naval Institute Press; 1990; 
 Calhoun, C. Raymond. Typhoon, the Other Enemy: The Third Fleet and the Pacific Storm of December 1944 ; Naval Institute Press; September 1981; 
 Cressman, Robert J. The Official Chronology of the U. S. Navy in World War II; Naval Institute Press; 2000; 
 Drury, Bob and Tom Clavin. "How Lieutenant Ford Saved His Ship", The New York Times, December 28, 2006
 Drury, Bob and Tom Clavin. Halsey's Typhoon: The True Story of a Fighting Admiral, an Epic Storm, and an Untold Rescue; Grove/Atlantic, Inc.; 2007; ; 
 Henderson, Bruce. Down to the Sea: An Epic Story of Naval Disaster and Heroism in World War II ;  Collins; 2007; 
 Melton, Buckner F., Jr. Sea Cobra, Admiral Halsey's Task Force and the Great Pacific Typhoon; Lyons Press; 2007; 
 Pawlowski, Gareth L. Flat-Tops and Fledglings; Gazelle Book Services Ltd, March 20, 1972; 
 US Department of Commerce. "Northern Hemisphere Synoptic Weather Map index" for 1944
 US Naval Historical Foundation. "Lieutenant Gerald Ford and Typhoon Cobra ", February 7, 2013

External links

 DESA webpage describing the disaster
 "World War II Pacific typhoons battered U.S. Navy", USA Today'' weather history, 2008
 Naval Historical Center FAQ

Cobra
Pacific Ocean theatre of World War II
1944 meteorology
1944 natural disasters
Cobra
1944 in Asia
1944 in Oceania
1944 in the Philippines